Thazhathu Kulakkada is a small village in Kollam district of Kerala state in India.It is near another place named Kulakkada

Economy
The people of this village are mainly farmers. Educated youths within the village travel outside of the state and overseas to seek better jobs. But the trend is now slowly changing. This is quiet evident from the number of agricultural farms situated there.

Temples
There is a big playground and two big temples (Thiru Amin Kunnathu Bhagawathi Temple & Puthiyidathu Sree Mahadevar Temple) is located in the centre of the village.

References

Villages in Kollam district